St Guthlac's Church is a church in Branston, Leicestershire. It is a Grade II* listed building.

History
The church dates from the 13th century but has 15th century additions. The nave roofs and the chancel were added in 1895-96 by Thomas Garner and George Frederick Bodley.

The church has a rare Hugh Russell organ dating from the 18th century. There is a Norman font and arches. The north aisle has a slab to John Spethyn dating from 1460.

Notes

References

Branston
Branston